Waisale Mateo Dausoko (born 29 October 1996) is an athlete representing Fiji. He participated in the qualification round in long jump at the World Championship in Athletics 2015 in Beijing.

His personal best in the event is  set in Suva in 2015.

Competition record

References

1996 births
Living people
Fijian male long jumpers
World Athletics Championships athletes for Fiji